The 1958 Great Britain Lions tour was the Great Britain national rugby league team's 11th tour of Australia and New Zealand and took place from May to November 1958. The Lions played 26 games on tour including the three test Ashes series against Australia and two tests against New Zealand.

The Great Britain squad was coached by Jim Brough. The team captain was Alan Prescott from St Helens while Phil Jackson from Barrow was the tour vice-captain. The team managers were Mr B. Manson and Tom Mitchell.

The tour saw a record AU£78,417 in gate receipts with the Lions taking home a profit in excess of £40,000.

Touring squad 
During the tour, players used numbers 1–26 in positional order, with full-backs as numbers 1 and 2. The Rugby League News published a photo of the touring squad and pen pictures of some players in two groups: one, and two.

Australian leg

Test venues 
The three Ashes series tests took place at the following venues. As per normal to maximise the gate, two tests were played at the 70,000 capacity Sydney Cricket Ground.

The final match before the first Test was often viewed by the home side as a chance to soften up the tourists and that was certainly the case in a violent clash which saw four players dismissed by referee Col Pearce – Vince Karalius (Great Britain); Greg Hawick, Rex Mossop and Peter Dimond (NSW).

The Ashes 
The three Ashes series tests drew an aggregate attendance of 171,060.

1st Test 

After going through the tour undefeated before the test, the Lions ran into a hungry Australian side who led 10–0 after just 10 minutes and led 18–0 at halftime in front of 68,777 fans at the SCG.

Lions test fullback Eric Fraser kicked 15 goals from 18 attempts in the match. Dick Huddart crossed for 4 tries while Eric Ashton and Mick Martyn each scored 3 tries.

2nd Test 

Inspired by captain Alan Prescott who played on until the end despite breaking his right arm in just the 3rd minute of the game, Great Britain leveled the series at 1–all with a 25–18 win over Australia in Brisbane. The injury ended Prescott's tour as a player. At half time, Prescott was offered a pain killing injection but refused, telling team manager Tom Mitchell "I just can’t got off, Tom. We would be two men short. We have got to win, so I had better help the boys". Great Britain also lost Dave Bolton with a broken collar bone after just 17 minutes.

With Vince Karalius and Brian McTigue providing the muscle and teenage scrum-half Alex Murphy providing the class, the Lions had the measure of Australia this day.

3rd Test 
Former Australian captain Ken Kearney played his 31st and last test.

Great Britain wrapped up The Ashes with a comprehensive 40–17 win over Australia in front of another 68,000+ crowd at the Sydney Cricket Ground. As he had done in the second test in Brisbane, 19 year old St Helens scrum-half Alex Murphy tormented the home side and was awarded the Man of the Match. Following the game, Lions players chaired injured captain Alan Prescott (carrying The Ashes cup) on a lap of honour of the ground.

The following matches took place after the New Zealand leg of the tour.

In this game against the NSWRFL's Representative Colts (U/21), future Australian captain Reg Gasnier played his first game against Great Britain.

New Zealand

1st Test 

Just a week after their Ashes triumph over Australia, Great Britain were brought back down to earth by a committed New Zealand side 15–10 at Carlaw Park in Auckland.

2nd Test 

With Alex Murphy returning from injury, Great Britain outclassed New Zealand 32–15 in front of 25,000 at Carlaw Park.

References 

Great Britain national rugby league team tours
Rugby league tours of Australia
Australia–United Kingdom relations
New Zealand–United Kingdom relations
Great Britain Lions tour
Great Britain Lions tour
Great Britain Lions tour
Rugby league tours of New Zealand